James Zell McDonald (born October 19, 1984) is an American former right-handed professional baseball pitcher who played in Major League Baseball (MLB) for the Los Angeles Dodgers and Pittsburgh Pirates.

McDonald was selected by the Los Angeles Dodgers in the 11th round of the June 2002 MLB Draft, and as a draft and follow pick, he played at Golden West College in Huntington Beach, California.

Early life
McDonald attended Long Beach Poly High School, where he played baseball, basketball and football. He played in the infield and pitched, however, he was selected by the Dodgers in 2002 more for his ability as a first baseman instead of a pitcher. But in junior college, McDonald's pitching improved so exponentially that he was signed by Los Angeles.

Professional baseball career

Los Angeles Dodgers
But instead of opting for a rehab program, McDonald and others were still interested in his hitting ability. He made the switch to outfield, thinking he could still work with trainers while keeping occupied in left field, but after sub-.230 batting averages in '04 with the Gulf Coast Dodgers and again in 2005 with the Ogden Raptors, he expressed his desire to return to pitching. "When I was in the outfield, I felt like I was just running around. I am a lot more competitive when I'm pitching, it's more up to me to get guys out." he explained to Bill Shelley. In , he was back on the hill full-time for the South Atlantic League's Columbus Catfish where he led the pitching staff with an ERA of 3.97 and 147 strikeouts in 143 innings of work but only managed to finish with a record of 5–10. McDonald started  with the Inland Empire 66ers before he was promoted to the Double-A Jacksonville Suns. He was named the Dodgers' Minor League Pitcher of the Year in 2007. In August 2008, he was promoted to the Dodgers Triple-A affiliate, Las Vegas 51s. He went 1–0 in his first two starts, striking out 20 batters in that span. He was called up to the Dodgers on September 1, 2008. He made his major league debut on September 17, 2008, against the Pittsburgh Pirates, working one scoreless inning in relief. In February 2009, McDonald was named the #56 prospect in baseball by Baseball America. McDonald then earned a spot in the Dodgers' starting rotation to begin the 2009 season and started his first game in the majors on April 10, 2009, at Chase Field against the Arizona Diamondbacks, allowing five runs in a little over two innings. He made three more starts, only lasting as many as five innings in one (April 25 against the Colorado Rockies, his first career victory), and then was demoted back to the bullpen. With an ERA of 6.75, he was optioned back to AAA on May 14, and then recalled by the Dodgers on June 19. After being recalled, he pitched exclusively out of the bullpen the rest of the season. McDonald began 2010 in the starting rotation for the Albuquerque Isotopes. He was recalled by the Dodgers to start the game on July 19 against the San Francisco Giants. He made a few additional appearances in the bullpen for the Dodgers. On July 31, 2010, McDonald was traded along with outfielder Andrew Lambo to the Pittsburgh Pirates for reliever Octavio Dotel.

Pittsburgh Pirates
On July 31, 2010, McDonald was traded along with outfielder Andrew Lambo to the Pittsburgh Pirates for reliever Octavio Dotel. In his Pirates debut, he pitched 6 innings of shutout ball against the Colorado Rockies and set a career-high with eight strikeouts in a 5–1 Pirates victory. "I was just real excited today and ready to be on the mound and to get a chance to start every five days," said McDonald. "I was having fun today. When you get ahead, pitching can be fun."

McDonald then pitched two consecutive shutouts, first on September 7, 2010 against the Atlanta Braves in a 5–0 Pirates victory and second on September 13 against the New York Mets. His streak of 20 straight scoreless innings, the longest by any Pirate pitcher since Zach Duke threw 22 straight scoreless innings in 2005, was ended against the Arizona Diamondbacks on September 18 although McDonald still earned the win to move to 4–1 at PNC Park.  His performances prompted Jack Moore of Fangraphs to call McDonald an "ace" for the Pirates and the biggest steal of the 2010 MLB Trading Deadline.

He completed the 2010 with a 4–5 record with a 3.52 ERA and 61 strikeouts in Pittsburgh over a span of 11 starts.

2011
McDonald allowed 21 earned runs over his first four starts, but finished May with a 2.86 ERA while giving up no more than three runs in any start. On two consecutive starts on July 19 and 25, McDonald allowed 0 runs against the Cincinnati Reds and the Atlanta Braves. Following the Atlanta game where McDonald out-dueled Braves ace Tim Hudson and struck out nine while walking none, he spoke about his control during the first half of the season. "It's been an issue for me this year. I told myself in the second half I was going to keep my walks down. Being ahead is a big key for me." The win helped propel the Pirates into a first-place tie in the NL Central with St. Louis. McDonald finished the season 9–9 with a  4.21 ERA, 142 strikeouts and 78 walks over 171 innings of work.

2012
To begin the 2012 campaign, McDonald delivered several quality starts before earning his first victory of the season on April 30 against Atlanta, a -inning, 10 strikeout performance. On May 17, McDonald set a new career-high for strikeouts with 11 against the Washington Nationals, while also taking a no-hit bid into the sixth inning. During the month of May, he posted a record of 3–1 with a sparkling 1.54 ERA. On June 21, McDonald pitched his first career complete game, against the Minnesota Twins, throwing 120 pitches and allowing one earned run. McDonald had a 2.37 ERA before the all-star break but a 7.52 ERA after the all-star break.

2013
McDonald was designated for assignment by the Pirates on September 7. He became a free agent on September 13.

Chicago Cubs
He signed a minor league contract with the Chicago Cubs on January 31, 2014. He did not pitch in a game for the team due to injury and became a free agent after the season.

In 2017, McDonald became a coach for the Southwest Nationals Baseball Organization, founded by former MLB pitcher Scott Elbert.

Pitching style
McDonald has a variety of pitches. His primary pitch is a four-seam fastball in the 91–94 mph range. He throws a two-seam fastball with similar velocity. He features two breaking balls: a slider (79–82) and a knuckle curve (75–77). His last pitch is a changeup in the low 80s. McDonald does not mix his repertoire differently between right-handed and left-handed hitters. He throws his four-seamer about half the time and uses his curveball most often when he is ahead in the count.

In the early part of the 2012 season, his slider was recognized as the NL's second-best swing-and-miss pitch, only behind Cole Hamels' changeup, with whiff rate of 49% since 2011.

Personal
McDonald's father, also named James, played basketball at USC and football for the Los Angeles Rams from 1983–87, while his uncle Ben McDonald, was a professional basketball player for the Golden State Warriors. His cousins are former Chicago Cubs outfielder Darnell McDonald and former New York Yankee and Kansas City Royal outfielder Donzell McDonald.

References

External links

1984 births
Living people
Los Angeles Dodgers players
Pittsburgh Pirates players
Gulf Coast Dodgers players
Columbus Catfish players
Ogden Raptors players
Golden West Rustlers baseball players
Inland Empire 66ers of San Bernardino players
Jacksonville Suns players
Las Vegas 51s players
Albuquerque Isotopes players
Altoona Curve players
Indianapolis Indians players
Gulf Coast Pirates players
Bradenton Marauders players
Arizona League Dodgers players
Tigres del Licey players
American expatriate baseball players in the Dominican Republic
Major League Baseball pitchers
Baseball players from Los Angeles
African-American baseball players
Baseball players from Long Beach, California
21st-century African-American sportspeople
20th-century African-American people
Long Beach Polytechnic High School alumni